Softball at the 2015 Southeast Asian Games was held at Kallang Softball Field of the Singapore Sports Hub at Kallang, Singapore from 6 to 10 June 2015.

Participating nations
A total of 170 athletes from five nations competed in softball at the 2015 Southeast Asian Games:

Competition schedule
The following was the competition schedule for the softball competitions:

Medalists

Medal table

Events

Men's tournament

Results – Preliminary Round

Results – Final round

Final standing

Women's tournament

The women competition of the softball event was held from 6–10 June 2015 at the Kallang Softball Field in Kallang, Singapore.

Schedule

Results – Preliminary Round

Results – Final round

Semifinals

Finals

Grand finals

Final standings

References

External links
 
 

2015
Southeast Asian Games
2015 Southeast Asian Games events
Softball competitions in Singapore
Kallang